Julia Vogl is an artist originally from Washington, D.C. who lives and works in London, England. She is a social sculptor, and primarily makes public art. Through a process of community engagement, her works build bright color into existing architectural landmarks, revealing local cultural values.

Works 
On January 11, 2009, she was funded by The Brooklyn Arts Council to create an installation in Fort Greene Park entitled Leaves of Fort Greene.

While attending the Slade School of Art in London she completed two other major public art works. The first was entitled "Colouring the Invisible," at the School of Slavonic and East European Studies (SEESS). The second was a work entitled "£1 000 000 | 1 000 opinions (where would you allocate £1 000 000 of public spending?)".

In 2012, Vogl received the Catlin Art Prize. She also received an Arts Council England Grant to make a public art project in Peckham, entitled HOME.

During 2013, Vogl was involved in a participatory artwork at the Discovery Museum Newcastle upon Tyne. The medium of the piece was recycled plastic bottles. Her work in Newcastle was the result of a Museums At Night competition that matched ten contemporary artists with ten museums for the weekend of May 16–18, 2013.

Vogl created an installation called "Tyson's Tiles" in Washington, D.C., 2015. The public artwork consisted of ground murals that incorporated information gathered through community engagement of over a thousand participants. The project aimed to raise awareness of public art.

In 2018, the Jewish Arts Collaborative recruited Vogl to create "Pathways to Freedom," a project that included a process of interviewing people in Boston about the ways that they felt free, as well as a graphical representation of these opinions. Individual participants received custom buttons related to their answers, which also influenced an artwork installed at the Soldiers and Sailors Monument in Boston Common from April 25 to May 14, 2018.

References

External links
 Julia Vogl
 Future Memorial, A social sculpture by Julia Vogl in collaboration with Arnos Vale Cemetery Trust and visitors to the historic site in Bristol, between July 2014 - July 2015

1985 births
Living people
Artists from Washington, D.C.
People from Brooklyn
Oberlin College alumni
Alumni of the Slade School of Fine Art
American women sculptors
21st-century American sculptors
21st-century American women